The Caisse de dépot et de gestion (French for Deposit and Management Fund, shortened as CDG) is a state-owned financial institution which manages long-term savings in Morocco. Given its substantial assets it also acts as a large investor in the country, especially in the tourism sector. It possesses many subsidiaries operating in various sectors of the Economy.

The CDG handles in particular the savings of the RCAR (Régime Collectif d'Allocations de Retraite) and the CNRA (Caisse Nationale de Retraites et d'Assurances) pension funds which groups the retirement contributions of the employees of state-owned companies and agencies. Between 2005 and 2008, CDG gained substantial funding when it acquired the management of the retirement savings of the OCP, the world's leading phosphate producer and exporter. CDG is modeled after the French fund Caisse des dépôts et consignations.

History
The fund was created in 1959 by Mamoun Tahiri, it holds about 35% of public savings in Morocco.

Past CEOs
 Mamoun Tahiri (October 1959–June 1965)
 Ahmed Bennani (June 1965–September 1966)
 Ahmed Benkirane (September 1966–January 1968)
 Hassan Ababou (January 1968–May 1970)
 Abdelkamel Reghaye (May 1970–July 1974)
 M'fadel Lahlou (July 1974–April 1995)
 Khalid el–Kadiri (April 1995–August 2001)
 Mustapha Bakkoury (August 2001–June 2009)
 Anas Houir Alami (June 2009–August 2015)
 Abdelatif Zaghnoun (2015–2022)
 Khalid Safir (  July 2022- present)

Investments
Renault-Tanger-Maroc

ClubMed & TUI

Starting in June 2006 CDG acquired its subsidiary Fipar International, 10% of Club Med and 5% of TUI for an estimated MAD3.7 billion. It additionally spent some MAD2 billion as part of development and renovation projects for Club Med's portfolio. In 2010, 2012 and 2013 saw the CDG gradually cede its stocks in Cub Med which have been dwindling since 2006 and finally sold at €17.5 in 2013, they have initially acquired for €44.9/share.

Subsidiaries
As of November 2013 the subsidiaries of CDG were:

Pension funds
Régime Collectif d'Allocation de Retraite (RCAR)
Caisse Nationale de Retraites et d'Assurances (CNRA)
Strategic Investments/Private Equity
Fipar-Holding
Banking
CDG Capital
CDG Capital Bourse
CDG Capital Gestion
CDG Capital Private Equity
CDG Capital Real Estate
CDG Capital Infrastructures
Maghreb Titrisation
CIH (Crédit Immobilier et Hotêlier)
Insurance
Atlanta
Société Centrale de Réassurance
Loans
SOFAC
Real-estate/Tourism
New Marina Casablanca (NMC)
Foncière Chellah
FINEA
Fonds Jaïda
Société de Développement Saïdia (SDS)
Société d'Aménagement et de Promotion de la Station de Taghazout (SAPST)
Agence d'Urbanisation & de Développement d'Anfa
Société d'Aménagement Zenata
Jnane Saïss Développement
Sonadac
Parc Haliopolis
MEDZ
Casanearshore / Technopolis
Nemotek Technologies
MEDZ Industrial Parks
MEDZ Sourcing
Oued Fès
CGI Management
Golf Management Maroc (GMM)
Al Manar Development Company
CGI
Dyar Al Mansour
Avilmar
Rabat Parking
Casa Développement
Témara Développement
CG Park
Noréa
Novec
Patrilog
Dyar Al Madina
Exprom Facilities
Hotels & Resorts of Morocco (HRM)
Sothermy
Royal Golf de Fès
SFCDG
Creative Technologies
Wood
Med Paper
Fonds Eucaforest
Cellulose du Maroc
Other
HP-CDG IT services Maroc 
Loterie Nationale

References

External links
www.cdg.ma
CDG profile at the IDFC

 
1959 establishments in Morocco
Banks of Morocco
Public pension funds in Morocco
Retirement in Morocco
Financial services companies of Morocco
Institutional investors
Government-owned companies of Morocco